Narendra Harshanaath Ekanayake (born 8 November 1977) is a Sri Lankan born Bahamian cricketer. Ekanayake is a left-handed batsman who bowls slow left-arm orthodox and who currently represents the Bahamas national cricket team. Ekanayak is the former captain of the Bahamas national cricket team.

Ekanayake made his debut for the Bahamas in the 2004 Americas Affiliates Championship against the Turks and Caicos Islands.	

Ekanayake made his Twenty20 debut for the Bahamas against the Cayman Islands in the 1st round of the 2006 Stanford 20/20.  He failed to take a wicket in the match. Ekanayake played his second and final Twenty20 match to date for the Bahamas in the 1st round of the 2008 Stanford 20/20 against Jamaica, where he took the wicket of Xavier Marshall.

Ekanayake represented the Bahamas in the 2008 ICC World Cricket League Division Five and in the 2010 ICC Americas Championship Division 2.  Ekanayake will represent the Bahamas in the 2010 ICC Americas Championship Division 1.

Ekanayake made his T20I debut against Cayman Islandsin ICC Men's T20 World Cup Americas Qualifier tournament.

References

External links
Narendra Ekanayake at Cricinfo
Narendra Ekanayake at CricketArchive

1977 births
Living people
Bahamian cricketers
Bahamas cricket captains
Sri Lankan emigrants to the Bahamas
Alumni of Trinity College, Kandy